The Obafemi Awolowo Stadium located at Liberty road, Ring Road in Ibadan, Nigeria, originally known as Liberty Stadium until 2010 is a football stadium with a capacity of 25,000 seats.

History

Construction
The stadium was opened in 1960 during the tenure of Chief Obafemi Awolowo who was serving as the Premier of the Western Region at the time. It was named Liberty Stadium in honor of Nigeria's independence. Constructed by direct labour under the supervision of the regional Ministry of Works and Transport, the stadium was the central location of sports in the old Western region of Nigeria. It was sited at the Southern end of Ibadan in 1960 near the summit of a hill, and located close to a bypass that leads to the Ibadan-Abeokuta and Ibadan-Lagos roads. 

The stadium, at inception, aside football pitch in the main bowl with floodlights, also boasted the indoor sports halls, swimming pool, courts for tennis, volleyball, handball, basketball, hockey, etc.

Boxing
On August 10, 1963 the stadium hosted the first ever boxing world title fight in Africa. The match was initially slated for July 13, 1963. This was for the Middleweight Championship of the World belt and was fought between Nigeria's own Dick Tiger and Gene Fullmer of the US.

African Cup of Nations
In 1980, the stadium hosted several matches during the African Cup of Nations, including a semi-final between Algeria and Egypt.

FIFA World Youth Championship
In 1999, the Liberty Stadium was selected along with eight other stadiums in Nigeria to host the 1999 FIFA World Youth Championship.  The stadium hosted all of the Group C matches, one of the Round of 16 matches, and one of the quarter-final matches.

Renaming
On November 12, 2010, the stadium was renamed as the Obafemi Awolowo Stadium. The renaming of the stadium was announced by the then Nigerian president, Dr. Goodluck Jonathan, when he visited Chief Obafemi Awolowo's widow, Chief (Mrs.) Hannah Awolowo.

Notable football events

1980 African Cup of Nations

1999 FIFA World Youth Championship

References

External links
World Stadiums: Liberty Stadium (Ibadan)

Football venues in Nigeria
Buildings and structures in Ibadan
Sport in Ibadan